KDXY (104.9 FM, "104.9 The Fox") is a radio station broadcasting a country music format. Licensed to Lake City, Arkansas, United States, it serves the Jonesboro, Arkansas, area.  The station is currently owned by Saga Communications.

KAIT morning segment
KDXY’s Trey Stafford and Jim Frigo appear on a segment called “The Foxhole” on KAIT’s morning show, “Good Morning Region 8”. This segment is about what is happening in the community and about an interesting news story brought up by Stafford or Frigo.

KDXY-HD2 (107.5FM K298AV Jonesboro)
"Hot 107.5 The Party Station" is a radio station broadcasting a Rhythmic Top 40/CHR format.

KDXY-HD3 (92.7FM K224DW Jonesboro)
"EZ 92.7 FM" is a radio station broadcasting a Soft AC format.

References

External links

DXY
Country radio stations in the United States
Radio stations established in 1987